Spilosoma curvilinea is a species of moth of the family Erebidae. It was described by Francis Walker in 1855. It is found in Cameroon, Republic of the Congo, Democratic Republic of the Congo, Ghana, Ivory Coast, Kenya, Nigeria, Senegal, Sierra Leone, Sudan, Tanzania, the Gambia and Uganda.

Description
In 1920 George F. Hampson described Diacrisia curvilinea, writing:

References

Spilosoma curvilinea at BOLD
Spilosoma curvilinea at BHL

curvilinea
Moths described in 1855
Fauna of the Gambia
Insects of Tanzania
Moths of Africa